William Hartley may refer to:

 William Hartley (martyr) (1557–1588), English Roman Catholic priest and martyr
 William Hartley (politician) (1868–1950), Australian politician
 William G. Hartley (born 1942), American historian and author
 William James Hartley (born 1945), political figure in British Columbia, Canada
 William Leonard Hartley (1916–2003), insurance salesman and politician in British Columbia, Canada
 Sir William Pickles Hartley (1846–1922), jam manufacturer and philanthropist
 Bill Hartley (activist) (1930–2006), Australian political activist
 Bill Hartley (athlete) (born 1950), English former athlete

See also
Hartley (disambiguation)